Annie Lowrie Alexander (January 10, 1864October 15, 1929) was an American physician and educator. She was the first licensed female physician in the Southern United States.

Biography
Alexander was born on January 10, 1864, near the town of Cornelius in Mecklenburg County, North Carolina. She was one of six children of John Brevard Alexander and Ann Wall Lowrie, descended from the Reverend Alexander Craighead and the Reverend David Caldwell.

She was heavily influenced by her father, also a doctor, to pursue the medical field after one of his female patients refused medical attention because he was male and as a result, died.

She was educated by a private tutor and her father and enrolled in the Woman's Medical College of Pennsylvania. She graduated with honors in 1884 and obtained her license to practice medicine from the Maryland Board of Medical Examiners the next year, earning the highest grade among 100 candidates. She started her own practice and was an assistant teacher of anatomy at the Women's Medical College of Baltimore. She returned to Mecklenburg County in 1887 to practice medicine and in 1889 she bought a home in Charlotte, North Carolina. She slowly built up her practice, making her rounds on a horse-drawn buggy until she purchased an automobile in 1911.

Alexander did postgraduate work at New York Polyclinic. Being a rarity, female physicians were not generally accepted in the late 1800s. Her work so shocked some of her relatives that they asked that her name not be mentioned in their presence.

For twenty-three years she was a physician for the Presbyterian College for Women (now known as Queens University of Charlotte). During Alexander's time in Charlotte, there were outbreaks of malaria and typhoid fever as well as a hookworm epidemic.

Alexander was a first lieutenant in the Army during World War I and was appointed acting assistant surgeon at Camp Greene in Charlotte, where she performed medical inspections of the school children and grappled with the devastation wrought by the 1918 flu pandemic.

She served as president of the Mecklenburg Medical Society and was a member of the United Daughters of the Confederacy, the Charlotte Woman's Club, and the Daughters of the American Revolution.

Alexander died on October 15, 1929, in Charlotte of pneumonia contracted from a patient.

Legacy 
Dr. Alexander was commemorated in 2022 with a statue by Jane DeDecker along Little Sugar Creek in Charlotte, North Carolina.

Further reading

 Annie L. Alexander Papers, J. Murrey Atkins Library, UNC Charlotte

References

1864 births
1929 deaths
People from Charlotte, North Carolina
People from Cornelius, North Carolina
Drexel University alumni
Physicians from North Carolina
Woman's Medical College of Pennsylvania alumni
19th-century American women physicians
19th-century American physicians
Daughters of the American Revolution people
Deaths from pneumonia in North Carolina
Members of the United Daughters of the Confederacy
People born in the Confederate States